Detlef Ultsch (born 7 November 1955) is a former East German judoka.

He was born in Sonneberg, Bezirk Suhl. He is the first German judo world champion and became a double world middleweight champion 1979 in Paris and 1983 in Moscow.

References

External links
 

1955 births
Living people
People from Sonneberg
People from Bezirk Suhl
German male judoka
Sportspeople from Thuringia
Olympic judoka of East Germany
Judoka at the 1976 Summer Olympics
Judoka at the 1980 Summer Olympics
Olympic bronze medalists for East Germany
Olympic medalists in judo
Medalists at the 1980 Summer Olympics
People of the Stasi
Recipients of the Patriotic Order of Merit in silver